The Abumonbazi Nature Reserve is a protected area situated in the Democratic Republic of the Congo, with a total area of 5,726.10 km.

References

Protected areas of the Democratic Republic of the Congo
Nord-Ubangi